The Floyd County Chronicle & Times is a bi-weekly newspaper based in Prestonsburg, Kentucky covering Floyd County, Kentucky. 

The paper was formed in 2017 when Lancaster Management, owner of the weekly Floyd County Chronicle, purchased the twice-weekly Floyd County Times (established in 1927) from Civitas Media and merged the two papers. It is published on Wednesday and Friday.

References

Newspapers published in Kentucky
Prestonsburg, Kentucky